}}

Sana ay Ikaw na Nga (International title: It Might Be You / ) is a Philippine television drama romance series broadcast by GMA Network. The series is a remake of a 2001 Philippine television drama series of the same title. Directed by Roderick Lindayag, it stars Mikael Daez and Andrea Torres. It premiered on September 3, 2012 on the network's Afternoon Prime line up replacing Kasalanan Bang Ibigin Ka?. The series concluded on February 8, 2013 with a total of 115 episodes. It was replaced by Bukod Kang Pinagpala in its timeslot.

Cast and characters

Lead cast
 Andrea Torres as Cecilia Fulgencio / Margarita Trajano
A beautiful and naive young lady. She is also dutiful daughter raised in hardship and strives hard to support her family. Her simple and quiet life turns upside down when she meets the wealthy and handsome Carlos Miguel, with whom she instantly falls in love. She believes that Carlos Miguel is her destiny. Little did she know that her romance with him will be what can lead her to tragedy that would drastically change her entire world.
 Mikael Daez as Carlos Miguel Altamonte
A wealthy, handsome businessman and heir of an established corporation who trapped in an arranged marriage with Olga Villavicer, a daughter of another wealthy businessman. Although he knew from the very beginning that the "marriage" is purposely designed to broaden their business empire, Carlos Miguel has learned to accept his fate and wholeheartedly submitted himself to his family’s selfish desires. However, his life is about to change when he meets Cecilia Fulgencio and discovered the true meaning of the word "love" in her.

Supporting cast
 Chynna Ortaleza / Andrea Torres / Ryza Cenon as Olga Villavicer / Sandra Sebastian
She grew up in the lap of luxury and is used to being given everything she wants. She is head-over-heels in love with Carlos Miguel and will do everything, even the most impossible things in the world—all for the love of him.
 Gabby Eigenmann as Gilbert Zalameda
Born to a life of privilege, Gilbert is used to having it all, except for one thing – love. Eventually, he will become Cecilia's "knight in shining armor". The one who will save and take care of her in her trying times and her source of strength to avenge those people who made her life a hell and reclaim what is rightfully hers.
 Rita Avila as Mariana Fulgencio
Mariana is the cruel mother of Cecilia. She comes from a dark past that gives her a bitter outlook towards life in general. Her greatest fear is to see her daughter commit the same mistakes she made in the past.
 Jestoni Alarcon as Ricardo Peron
The only man Mariana truly loved and Cecilia's long lost father. He made some hurtful decisions in the past so that despite being blessed with a good life, he feels that there's a big part of his life that's missing.
 Alicia Alonzo as Victoria Altamonte
Manipulative grandmother of Carlos Miguel. She will destroy the lives of anyone who dare to ruin her plans for her grandson and sole heir's life.
 Jan Marini as Maria Consuelo Villavicer
A cold-hearted spinster and the greedy, conceited and scheming older sister of Olga. In her ruthless quest for power and wealth, she will drive Olga to pursue her craziness towards Carlos Miguel, to acquire his family's wealth and vast properties. She was later on revealed as the real mother of Olga Villavicer.
 Ynna Asistio as Esmeralda "Esme" Garela
Loud and bubbly, Esmeralda or just simply "Esme" is the best friend and confidante of Cecilia whom she knows she can always depend on when worse comes to worst.
 Marky Lopez as Alvin Guevarra
Friend of Carlos Miguel. A natural comedian, Alvin is nevertheless trustworthy and down-to-earth.
 Jace Flores as Dandoy
Cecilia's avid suitor. Despite being rejected and avoided by Cecilia, he continuously hopes that his love for her will someday be reciprocated.
 Chynna Ortaleza as Dulce
Introduced by Consuelo to Ricardo as "Olga". Dolce's image is completely similar to Olga's first image but their characteristics are far different from each other. Everyone like Carlos Miguel and Cecilia thought her as Olga at first. She initially joined Olga's side. However, after she is forced by Leopoldo to give-in the ransom to him, she is saved by Carlos Miguel and rescued Cecilia and Carlitos from Olga in the end of the series.

Guest cast
 Tanya Garcia as Joanna Altamonte
 Maricar de Mesa as Bernadette Zalameda
 Rommel Padilla as Leopold Guerrero 
 Dexter Doria as Sofia 
 Mel Martinez as Alfie
 Ama Quiambao as a fortune teller
 Irma Adlawan as Libay
 Dex Quindoza as Carding

Origin

Sana ay Ikaw na Nga (lit. Hope It's Really You) was a television series originally created by RJ Nuevas on GMA Network. The series ran for two years. It premiered on December 3, 2001 and concluded on April 25, 2003.

The original version starred Dingdong Dantes and Tanya Garcia as Carlos Miguel Altamonte and Cecilia Fulgencio/Olga Villavicer respectively. It was under the direction of Gil Tejada, Jr.

Production and development
On August 3, 2012, the network announced that they had decided to remake Sana ay Ikaw na Nga. The same date, the production team introduced the actors that would portray the two main characters, Mikael Daez and Andrea Torres.

While there are many similarities to the original version, many changes were made. Headwriter, RJ Nuevas, whose concept gave birth to the original series, further stated that compare to the original series, the new version's storyline is more matured and daring. "We had to make the story more contemporary. This is a great challenge for all of us. After a decade, one of the most-loved teledramas in Philippine television will be given a different touch that is appropriate for today's times. We’re speeding it up a little bit [because the series is good only for one season] and putting some more interesting twists and turns", he added.

Casting
Andrea Torres and Mikael Daez were chosen to play Cecilia and Carlos Miguel, respectively. The two are very happy and beyond grateful that their mother studio is trusting them with their own drama series.

Torres underwent several acting workshops as her preparation for her role.

Prior to this project, Torres once got so depressed at work that she even thought of quitting show business. She stated: "There was a point when I asked myself if I really had a future here. I gave myself until age 24 or 25. If nothing happened, I'd start looking in another direction". Until her big break had finally come. "I waited for this for so long! It's a good thing I didn't lose hope or just decided to quit. I'm glad I still believed this would happen to me. And now I’m feeling the pressure. I'm working twice as hard to prove that I deserve it", she added.

Music
The series uses the song "Ikaw na Sana", a Vehnee Saturno original piece. Mark Bautista and Rachelle Ann Go performed the song.

Ratings
According to AGB Nielsen Philippines' Mega Manila household television ratings, the pilot episode of Sana ay Ikaw na Nga earned a 16.4% rating. While the final episode scored a 22.2% rating.

Accolades

References

External links
 

2012 Philippine television series debuts
2013 Philippine television series endings
Filipino-language television shows
GMA Network drama series
Philippine romance television series
Television series reboots
Television shows set in the Philippines